Alberni may refer to:

Port Alberni, a city of Vancouver Island, British Columbia, Canada
Alberni (electoral district), a defunct electoral district of British Columbia, Canada
Alberni Inlet, an inlet of Vancouver Island, British Columbia, Canada
Alberni Valley, a valley of Vancouver Island, British Columbia, Canada
HMCS Alberni, a Flower-class of the Royal Canadian Navy

People with the surname
Luis Alberni (1886–1962), Spanish-born American actor

See also
Alberni Quartet, an English string quartet